Ferhat is a Turkish given name and the Turkish spelling of the Persian name Ferhad (farhād). It may refer to:

Given name

Ferhad
 Ferhad Ayaz (born 1994), Turkish-Swedish footballer
 Ferhad Pasha Sokolović 16th-century Ottoman general and statesman of Bosniak origin
 Serdar Ferhad Pasha, 16th-century Ottoman grand vizier

Ferhat
 Ferhat Abbas (1899–1985), Algerian political leader
 Ferhat Encü (born 1985), Kurdish imprisoned politician
 Ferhat Akbaş (born 1986), Turkish volleyball coach and former volleyball player
 Ferhat Akdeniz (born 1986), Turkish volleyball player
 Ferhat Arıcan (born 1993), Turkish male artistic gymnast
 Ferhat Atik (born 1971), Turkish Cypriot filmmaker
 Ferhat Bakal (born 1998), Turkish ice hockey player
 Ferhat Bey Draga (1880–1944), Kosovo Albanian politician
 Ferhat Bıkmaz (born 1988), Turkish footballer
 Ferhat Çerçi (born 1981), Turkish-German footballer
 Ferhat Çökmüş (born 1985), Turkish footballer
 Ferhat Görgülü (born 1991), Turkish-Dutch footballer
 ferhat Güven (born 1983), Turkish-Norwegian politician
 Ferhat Kaplan (born 1989), Turkish footballer
 ferhat Kaya (born 1986), Turkish-Belgian footballer
 Ferhat Kiraz (born 1989), Turkish footballer
 Ferhat Kıskanç (born 1982), Turkish-German footballer
 Ferhat Korkmaz (born 1981), Turkish-Swedish footballer
 Ferhat Mehenni (born 1951), Algerian singer and politician
 Ferhat Odabaşı (born 1983), Turkish footballer
 Ferhat Ozcep (born 1968), Turkish geophysicist and historian
 Ferhat Öztorun (born 1987), Turkish footballer
 Ferhat Pehlivan (born 1988), Turkish amateur boxer
 Ferhat Sercan Saylik (born 1992), Turkish footballer
 Ferhat Tunç (born 1964), Kurdish singer
 Ferhat Yazgan (born 1992), Turkish footballer

Surname
 Halima Ferhat,  Moroccan female historian
 Zinedine Ferhat (born 1993), Algerian footballer

Other uses
 Farhad and Shirin Monument, a monument in Amasya, Turkey
 Ferhadija Mosque in Sarajevo, a mosque in Sarajevo, Bosnia and Herzegovina
Ferhat Pasha Mosque, amosque in Banja Luka, Bosnia and Herzegovina
 Jijel Ferhat Abbas Airport, an airport near Jijel, Algeria

Turkish masculine given names